ABB Şakirpaşa is a handball club based in the Şakirpaşa neighbourhood of the city of Adana. The club's women's team promoted to the Turkish Handball Super League on 21 April 2016, at the playoff finals in Ankara.  The venue of the club is Yüreğir Serinevler Arena.

References

External links

 Turkish Women's Handball First League

Sport in Adana
Turkish handball clubs